This is a list of notable past and present personalities associated with the television and radio arms of the Canadian Broadcasting Corporation.

A
Roger Abbott, late member of Royal Canadian Air Farce
Vik Adhopia, reporter covering affairs of Newfoundland and Labrador
Kate Aitken, radio and television personality of the 1930s to 1950s
Madeleine Allakariallak, former anchor of Igalaaq on CFYK-DT
Andrew Allan, national head of CBC Radio Drama from 1943 to 1955
Tom Allen, host of Shift on CBC Radio 2
Barbara Amiel
Aba Amuquandoh
Steve Armitage, former CBC-Sports reporter and play-by-play announcer
Peter Armstrong; former host of World Report on CBC Radio 1, foreign correspondent for CBC Television and CBC Newsworld; currently the economics reporter for CBC News
Adrienne Arsenault, Chief Correspondent for CBC News, co-host of The National
Marie-Louise Arsenault, arts journalist
Michel C. Auger, former host of CBF-FM, Ici Radio-Canada Le 15-18.  As of Fall 2015, host of Midi Info.
Nahlah Ayed, host of Ideas, foreign correspondent

B
Randy Bachman, host of Randy Bachman's Vinyl Tap
Brent Bambury, host of Go, Brave New Waves, Midday
James Barber, hosted the cooking show called The Urban Peasant
Andy Barrie, former host of Metro Morning
Alex Barris
Rosemary Barton, CBC News Network (former host of Power & Politics)
Anita Bathe, anchor at CBUT
David Bazay
Marie-France Bazzo
Claude Beauchamp
Nadira Begg, CBC News: Northbeat
Ralph Benmergui, host of Midday
Avril Benoit, This Morning
Pierre Berton
Guy Bertrand
Christine Birak, health and science journalist
Jim Bittermann, Toronto-based reporter; now CNN senior correspondent.
Arthur Black, host of Basic Black
Ian Black, meteorologist with CBOT-DT
Tim Blanks
Keith Boag
Denise Bombardier, hosted, among others, the shows Présent international, Le point, Noir sur blanc (1979–1983) and Trait-d'union (1987–1988)
Roy Bonisteel, host of Man Alive
Susan Bonner, The National reporter
Harry Brown, host of As It Happens from 1968 to 1974
Hilary Brown
Ian Brown
Jim Brown
Laurie Brown
Patrick Brown, reporter, long-time China correspondent of CBC News
Rob Brown
Robin Brown
Maureen Brosnahan
Gilles Brunet
Kim Brunhuber
Dianne Buckner
Barbara Budd, As It Happens
Stéphan Bureau participated in Telejeans as a teenager and later hosted Le Téléjournal/Le point (1998–2003).
Stanley Burke
Tony Burman

C
Spence Caldwell
Bill Cameron, correspondent and anchor
Earl Cameron, The National
Cassie Campbell
John Candy, Coming Up Rosie
Pat Carrabré
Rita Celli
Henry Champ
Andrew Chang, co-host of The National
Christiane Charette
Piya Chattopadhyay
Wei Chen
Don Cherry, Hockey Night in Canada
Don Chevrier
Ify Chiwetelu
Lisa Christiansen
Dinah Christie
Natalie Chung
Natalie Clancy
John Clark Host Junior Magazine 1956-60
Adrienne Clarkson, former Governor General of Canada hosted shows such as Take 30 and the fifth estate
Robert Clothier
Véronique Cloutier
Rick Cluff
David Cochrane, journalist
Saroja Coelho
Nathan Cohen, theatre reviewer and host of Fighting Words in the 1950s and 1960s
Bob Cole, Hockey Night in Canada
Leon Cole
David Common
Ernie Coombs, Mr. Dressup
Jim Corcoran, À Propos
Ward Cornell
Arisa Cox
Andrew Coyne
Gavin Crawford, Because News, This Hour Has 22 Minutes (2002-2010)
Mark Critch, This Hour Has 22 Minutes
Neil Crone
Kelly Crowe
Sandy Cushin
Chris Cuthbert, play-by-play sports announcer

D
Cynthia Dale
Joyce Davidson
Fred Davis, host of Front Page Challenge
Stu Davis, hosted several CBC radio and television series in 1950s and 60s
Garth Dawley
Gill Deacon, host of Here and Now, former host of The Gill Deacon Show
Gerry Dee
Rosanna Deerchild
Norman DePoe
Bernard Derome, Le Téléjournal
Michel Désautels
Trevor Dineen
Gordon Donaldson - covered space exploration
Joan Donaldson - former journalist and producer of CBC Newsworld
Terry Donnelly
James Doohan, Star Trek's "Scotty", worked in both CBC radio and television in the 1940s and 50s
Jeff Douglas - As it Happens
Raina Douris
Bruce Dowbiggin
Peter Downie
Bronwyn Drainie
Dwight Drummond, CBC News at Six anchor in Toronto
Jonathan Dube
Mike Duffy, former reporter on CBC radio and The National.
Nana aba Duncan, former host of Podcast Playlist
Nancy Durham
Simon Durivage
Howard Dyck

E
Lorne Elliott, Madly Off in All Directions
Michael Enright, former host of The Sunday Edition
Margaret Evans, foreign correspondent, former Middle East bureau chief
Mary Jo Eustace

F
Natasha Fatah
Don Ferguson, Royal Canadian Air Farce
Max Ferguson, radio and television announcer.
Gillian Findlay
Danny Finkleman
Robert Fisher
Martina Fitzgerald
Darren Flutie, CFL colour commentator
Ken Finkleman
Mary Lou Finlay, former co-host of As It Happens, The Journal
Joe Flaherty
Harry Flemming, political commentator on CBHT's First Edition
Dave Foley, writer and actor on The Kids in the Hall from 1989 to 1994, starred in the NBC sitcom Newsradio.
Craig Forrest - MLS match analyst, general soccer commentator.
Phillip Forsyth - co-host, As It Happens
Mark Forsythe
Michael J. Fox, in The Magic Lie series, 1978
Yuani Fragata
Whit Fraser- reporter National Radio and TV News, Anchor Newsworld
Greg Frers
Elliotte Friedman
Barbara Frum, host of As It Happens (1971–1981) and The Journal (1982–1992)
Melissa Fung

G
Vicki Gabereau
Céline Galipeau
Danny Gallivan, Hockey Night in Canada play-by-play announcer
Matt Galloway, host of The Current, former host of Metro Morning and Podcast Playlist
Sue Gardner, executive director of the Wikimedia Foundation, was a producer for CBC Radio and the director of the CBC's online news operations.
Richard Garneau
Hana Gartner
Lana Gay
Mitsou Gélinas
Russ Germain
Bruno Gerussi
Jian Ghomeshi
Bill Gillespie
Kevin Gillis
Clyde Gilmour, host of Gilmour's Albums (1956–1997)
David Gilmour
Dale Goldhawk
Brian Goldman
Jonathan Goldstein
Bill Good, former anchor for CBUT's NewsCentre (1978–1989)
Jurgen Gothe, host of CBC Radio 2, national classical music program DiscDrive from 1985 to 2008
Joseph Goudie
Luba Goy, Royal Canadian Air Farce
Arvel Gray
Lorne Greene, CBC's chief radio announcer (1939–1942), covering much of World War II
David Grierson
Liz Grogan
Bill Guest
Peter Gzowski, prominent journalist and author, host of Morningside.

H
Benita Ha
Aamer Haleem
Geri Hall, This Hour Has 22 Minutes (2004-2011)
David Halton
Matthew Halton
Marie-Lynn Hammond
Ian Hanomansing, host on The National, Canada Now
Adrian Harewood, CBC News at Six anchor in Ottawa
Tom Harrington
Don Harron, host of Morningside
Ali Hassan
Jane Hawtin
Geraldine Heaney
Chantal Hébert, political commentator on CBC, columnist for Toronto Star
Larry Henderson
Bill Hewitt, Hockey Night in Canada play-by-play broadcaster
Foster Hewitt, Hockey Night in Canada play-by-play broadcaster/color commentator
Heather Hiscox
Dave Hodge, former host of Hockey Night in Canada
Jessica Holmes, Royal Canadian Air Farce
Bob Homme
Chris Howden
Jim Hughson, Hockey Night in Canada
Ross Hull, CBC Toronto meteorologist
Paul Hunter
Tommy Hunter
Tariq Hussain, CBC Radio 3
Chris Hyndman, former co-host of Steven and Chris
Mary Hynes

I
Jay Ingram, host of Quirks and Quarks (1979-1992)
Brenda Irving, CBC Sports
Mary Ito

J
Wolfman Jack
Judith Jasmin started working for Radio-Canada in the late 1940s, co-hosted Carrefour with René Lévesque on Radio-Canada/Radio, hosted Reportage and Conférence de presse, she became the first woman named foreign correspondent for Radio-Canada at the UN (1966), and then in Washington, DC.
Michaëlle Jean, Governor General of Canada Hosted the documentary series The Passionate Eye and Grands Reportages, and produced and hosted individual documentary films
Stu Jeffries - Good Rockin' Tonight, Switchback
Charles Jennings, journalist
 Peter Jennings, at age nine, hosted a kids’ program called Peter’s People on CBC Radio in Ottawa
Erica Johnson
Falen Johnson
Molly Johnson
Andy Jones
Cathy Jones, This Hour Has 22 Minutes
Colleen Jones
Daryn Jones
Khari Jones

K
Vassy Kapelos, host of Power & Politics
Mark Kelley, journalist
Fraser Kelly
Betty Kennedy
Paul Kennedy
Tom Kennedy
Peter Kent
Susan Kent, This Hour Has 22 Minutes
Florence Khoriaty
Wab Kinew (8th Fire, The 204, Canada Reads)
Peter Knegt
Nil Köksal, CBC Newsworld
Leora Kornfeld (RealTime, RadioSonic)
Ken Kostick

L
Amanda Lang
Augusta La Paix
Laurier LaPierre
Kirk LaPointe
Holly Larocque
Karin Larsen
Ricardo Larrivée, host of Ricardo on Radio-Canada
Emmanuelle Latraverse
Grant Lawrence, CBC Radio 3
Roméo LeBlanc
René Lecavalier, war correspondent (World War II), then hosted La Soirée du hockey from its beginning on Radio-Canada television on October 11, 1952 (Montreal Canadiens vs. Detroit Red Wings) until the 1970s
Mark Lee, former CBC Sports reporter
Sook-Yin Lee
Terry Leibel
René Lévesque - Worked as journalist for Radio-Canada from after World War II (during which he served as war correspondent for the US Army) to 1960, covering such events as the Korean War (1951–1953) and hosting Point de mire. He moved on becoming a prominent cabinet minister in Quebec's Jean Lesage Liberal Government (1960), and later Premier of Quebec (Parti Québécois, 1976).
Eugene Levy
Avi Lewis
Dana Lewis
Sharon Lewis
Rex Loring, announcer
Charles Burchill Lynch
Laura Lynch

M
Ann-Marie MacDonald, Life and Times
Irene MacDonald
Neil Macdonald
Rick MacInnes-Rae
Linden MacIntyre
Ron MacLean, host of Hockey Night in Canada
Carole MacNeil
Rita MacNeil, Rita and Friends
Meredith MacNeill
Sheila MacVicar, former CBS, CNN and ABC news reporter and now with Al Jazeera America
Gloria Macarenko
Bob Mackowycz
Judy Maddren
Alan Maitland, As It Happens (1974–1993)
Shaun Majumder, comedian, This Hour Has 22 Minutes (2003-2017)
Eric Malling
Katie Malloch
Greg Malone
Harry Mannis
Peter Mansbridge, former host of The National
Rosa Marchitelli
Jeff Marek
Andrea Martin
Claire Martin
Ginella Massa
Terry Matte
Alexis Mazurin
Trent McClellan, comedian, This Hour Has 22 Minutes
Duncan McCue
Bruce McCulloch
Bob McDonald, host of Quirks and Quarks (1992- )
Kevin McDonald
Marguerite McDonald
Allan McFee
David McGuffin
Terence McKenna, correspondent for CBC News
Bob McKeown
Mark McKinney, writer and actor in The Kids in the Hall from 1989 to 1994.
George McLean
Stuart McLean, host of Vinyl Cafe
Bernie McNamee
Marnie McPhail
Casey Mecija, host of The Doc Project
Ann Medina
Anne-Marie Mediwake, CBC News at Six anchor in Toronto
Suhana Meharchand
Rick Mercer, comedian, The Rick Mercer Report (2004-2018), This Hour Has 22 Minutes (1993-2001)
Ruby Mercer
Wendy Mesley
Don Messer
Lorne Michaels, The Hart and Lorne Terrific Hour (1970–1971)
Terry Milewski
Greg Millen
Gord Miller
Sean Millington
Colin Mochrie
Rick Moranis
John Morgan
Jordi Morgan
Keith Morrison
Barry Morse
Terry David Mulligan
Patrick Munro
Rex Murphy
Anne Murray, on Singalong Jubilee, in the 1960s

N
Pascale Nadeau
Pierre Nadeau, journalist, television and radio presenter and producer having anchored Le Téléjournal and hosted Le Point and Enjeux
Knowlton Nash, prominent newsreader and host
Rassi Nashalik, former anchor of Igalaaq on CFYK-DT
Alan Neal
Harry Neale
Julie Nesrallah
Don Newman
Kevin Newman
Sydney Newman
Lori Nichol
Craig Norris
Habiba Nosheen, co-host, The Fifth Estate

O
Catherine O'Hara, Coming Up Rosie, as Myrna Wallbacker and Schitt's Creek as Moira Rose
Kevin O'Leary - former member of Dragons' Den, former co-host of The Lang and O'Leary ExchangeTerry O'Reilly, host of Under the InfluenceScott Oake
Carol Off, co-host of As It HappensPeter Oldring
Susan Ormiston
Royal Orr

P
Steve Paikin
Murray Parker
Amanda Parris
Tony Parsons
Steve Patterson
Francine Pelletier
Fred Penner
Lloyd Percival
Jacquie Perrin, Weekend Anchor
Holger Petersen
Saša Petricic
Anne Petrie
Curt Petrovich
Kathleen Petty
Geoff Pevere
Cameron Phillips
Mark Phillips
Gordon Pinsent
Aarti Pole
Ross Porter
Tom Power
Sue Prestedge
Valerie Pringle
Belle Puri

R
Tim Ralfe - interviewer for CBC of Pierre Trudeau when he spoke the famous line,"Just watch me."
Sean Rameswaram, host of Podcast PlaylistGreg Rasmussen
Vic Rauter
Judy Rebick
Drew Remenda
Bill Richardson
Daniel Richler
Erika Ritter
Jo-Ann Roberts
John Robertson
Lloyd Robertson - hosted CBC Weekend in 1969 and anchored CBC'sThe National from 1970 to 1976; presently CTV cohost of W5.
Carla Robinson
Ken Rockburn
Bruce Rogers
Fred Rogers' Mister Rogers show (CBC, 1962) show became Mister Rogers' Neighborhood on NET (later PBS) in 1968.
Shelagh Rogers, host of The Next ChapterWilliam Ronald
Carlo Rota, Great Canadian Food ShowTerry Rusling, radio engineer, electronic composer
Lynne Russell, American born former CNN and CBC Newsworld anchor
Scott Russell

S
Steven Sabados, Steven and ChrisAndrew Sabiston
Bernard St-Laurent
Percy Saltzman, weatherman, was the first person to have appeared on CBLT CBC Television in 1952.
Jeanne Sauvé - The late Governor General of Canada was a freelance journalist for CBC Radio starting in 1952
Lorne Saxberg, original CBC Newsworld anchor
Talia Schlanger
Joe Schlesinger
Patti Schmidt, Brave New WavesDave Seglins, The World This WeekendTommy Sexton
Shad
Andy Sheppard
Tetsuro Shigematsu, The RoundupMartin Short, Peep Show guest in "Goldberg is Waiting" episode
René Simard
Katie Simpson
Gordon Sinclair
Lister Sinclair, IdeasStephen Smart
Alison Smith
Paul Soles
Shelley Solmes
Evan Solomon, CBC News: Sunday NightEric Sorensen
Tina Srebotnjak
Brian Stewart
Janet Stewart
Cy Strange, host of As It Happens and Fresh Air for many decades
George Stroumboulopoulos, CBC News: The HourJack Sullivan, head of research for the 1976 Summer Olympics
Patty Sullivan Kids' CBCDonald Sutherland started at age 14 with CBC Radio in Halifax, Nova Scotia
David Suzuki
Diana Swain
Kevin Sylvester
Alexandra Szacka

T
Tim Tamashiro
Jimmy Tapp
Carole Taylor
Maureen Taylor
Jowi Taylor
Jan Tennant was the first woman to host The National when she appeared as a substitute newsreader
Rich Terfry, also known as the rapper Buck 65 hosts Radio 2 DriveAngeline Tetteh-Wayoe
Dave Thomas
Greg Thomey
Rosemary Thompson
Scott Thompson writer and actor in The Kids in the Hall from 1989 to 1994.
Shawn Thompson
Pauline Thornhill
Asha Tomlinson
Ziya Tong
Jonathan Torrens, hosted Jonovision and former host of Street Cents
Alex Trebek, Reach for the Top co-host, Strategy host, 1969
Anna Maria Tremonti
Peter Trueman
Sheldon Turcott

V
Julie Van Dusen
Adam Vaughan
John Vernon
Nerene Virgin

WXYZ
Eleanor Wachtel, Writers and CompanyConnie Walker
Claire Wallace, host of They Tell Me from 1942 to 1952, first woman broadcaster to learn how to fly a plane
Pamela Wallin - Worked as a producer on CBC Radio.  Her first TV work was on CTV's Canada AM.  She later appeared on CBC TV, as cohost of Prime Time News and later host of Pamela Wallin Live.
Mary Walsh, writer, director, comedian, This Hour Has 22 Minutes'' (1993-2013)
John Warren
Morgan Waters
Patrick Watson
Al Waxman
Wayne and Shuster
Jack Webster, panelist on Front Page Challenge
Brian Williams, CBC Sports
Nancy Wilson, CBC Newsworld
Paul Winn
David Wisdom
Don Wittman, CBC Sports
Nancy Wood
Paul Workman
Stephen Yan
Marcia Young
Andrew Younghusband
Nora Young
Moses Znaimer
Richard Zussman

References

+